Nibir Mandal (born 1963) is an Indian structural geologist and a professor of Geological Sciences at Jadavpur University. He is known for his studies on the evolution of geological structures and is an elected fellow of Indian Academy of Sciences, and the Indian National Science Academy. The Council of Scientific and Industrial Research, the apex agency of the Government of India for scientific research, awarded him the Shanti Swarup Bhatnagar Prize for Science and Technology, one of the highest Indian science awards for his contributions to Earth, Atmosphere, Ocean and Planetary Sciences in 2005.

Biography 

Nibir Mandal, born on 6 November 1963 at Jahangirpur in the Murshidabad district of the Indian state of West Bengal to Mahadev Mandal-Renuka couple, completed his graduate studies in science at Jadavpur University in 1984 and obtained a master's degree from the same university in 1987. He continued at the university for his doctoral studies as a CSIR research fellow , and after securing a PhD in 1991, joined Allahabad University in 1992 as a lecturer but moved back to his alma mater as a lecturer the same year. He has been serving the university since then, holding the positions of a senior lecturer and reader before becoming a professor of the department of geology, a position he holds till date. In between, he did his post-doctoral studies at Hokkaido University as a JSPS visiting scientist and at ETH Zurich as a post-doctoral fellow. He also serves as an adjunct professor at the department of earth sciences of the Indian Institute of Technology Kanpur.

Legacy 
Mandal is known to have done researches on the evolution of geological structures. Through his experimental and theoretical work, he is reported to have proposed a theory of particle motion associated with faults undergoing both translational and rotational movement. His studies have been documented in several peer-reviewed articles; ResearchGate, an online repository of scientific articles, has listed 74 of them. Besides, he has also contributed chapters to books edited by others.

Awards and honors 
Mandal received the Young Scientist Medal of the Indian National Science Academy in 1992. The Council of Scientific and Industrial Research awarded him the Shanti Swarup Bhatnagar Prize, one of the highest Indian science awards in 2005. He was elected as a fellow by the Indian Academy of Sciences also in 2006 and he became a fellow of the Indian National Science Academy in 2010. Three years later, he received the 2012 G. D. Birla Award for Scientific Research of the K. K. Birla Foundation.

Selected bibliography

Chapters in Books

Articles 
 
 
 
 
 
 Ritabrata Dasgupta, Nibir Mandal (2022). "Role of double-subduction dynamics in the topographic evolution of the Sunda Plate". Geophys. J. Int. (published July 2022). 230 (1): 696-713. doi.org/10.1093/gji/ggac025

See also 
 Indian Shield
 Diapir

Notes

References

External links 
 
 
 
 

Recipients of the Shanti Swarup Bhatnagar Award in Earth, Atmosphere, Ocean & Planetary Sciences
1963 births
Indian scientific authors
Indian geologists
People from Murshidabad district
Bengali scientists
Jadavpur University alumni
Hokkaido University alumni
ETH Zurich alumni
Academic staff of the University of Allahabad
Academic staff of Jadavpur University
Academic staff of IIT Kanpur
Fellows of the Indian Academy of Sciences
Fellows of the Indian National Science Academy
Living people
Scientists from West Bengal
20th-century Indian earth scientists